Army of Death is a Big Finish Productions audio drama based on the long-running British science fiction television series Doctor Who.

Plot
The Doctor and Mary Shelley find themselves on the planet Draxine, facing down an army of walking skeletons.

Cast
The Doctor - Paul McGann
Mary Shelley - Julie Cox
President Vallan - David Harewood
Lady Meera - Carolyn Pickles
Nia Brusk - Eva Pope
Commander Raynar/Karnex - Mitch Benn
Sherla/Baden/Tox - Joanna Christie
Captain Maddox/Stennan/Sentries - Trevor Cooper

External links
Army of Death

References 

2011 audio plays
Eighth Doctor audio plays